The Primetime Emmy Award for Outstanding Variety Special (Live) is awarded to one live television special each year. The award was presented as Outstanding Special Class Program until it was restructured for the 70th Primetime Emmy Awards.

In the following list, the first titles listed in gold are the winners; those not in gold are nominees, which are listed in alphabetical order. The years given are those in which the ceremonies took place.

Winners and nominations

1970s

Outstanding Classical Program in the Performing Arts

1980s

1990s

Outstanding Cultural Program

Outstanding Cultural Music-Dance Program

Outstanding Classical Music-Dance Program

2000s

Outstanding Special Class Program

2010s

Outstanding Variety Special (Live)

2020s

Notes

References

External links
 Academy of Television Arts and Sciences website

Variety Special (Live)